Gunnar Lindqvist or Gunnar Lindkvist or Gunnar Lindquist:  may refer to:
 Gunnar Lindqvist (military personnel) (1898–1973), Finnish military personnel
 Gunnar Lindkvist (actor) (1916–1990), Swedish actor